Aarhus Håndbold was a handball club from Aarhus, Denmark. The club was founded in 2001 originally under the name Århus GF, as an extension of the traditional Aarhus clubs AGF, Brabrand IF, VRI and Århus KFUM/YMCA / Hasle. AGF chose later to withdraw from the superstructure. The home arena of Aarhus Håndbold was Ceres Arena.

The club struggled in the last year of its existence with economic problems and in April 2021 the club was declared bankrupt. In connection with this all the players from Aarhus Håndbold were released and Århus Håndbold merged with the neighbors from Skanderborg Håndbold under the name Skanderborg Aarhus Håndbold.

Seasons

European Handball

EHF Champions League

EHF Cup

Cup Winners Cup

Notable former players

 Robert Gunnarsson
 Kasper Søndergaard
 Kasper Irming Andersen
 Christopher McDermott

References

External links
 Official website

Defunct handball clubs in Denmark
Sport in Aarhus